Kerishnie Naiker is a South African beauty pageant titleholder who was crowned Miss South Africa 1997. Naiker placed Top 5 at Miss World 1998 and later that year, she went on Miss Universe 1998 and placed among the Top 10 finalists.

Early life
Kerishnie Naiker grew up in Reservoir Hills, Durban with her parents Amra and Joey, a self-employed businessman and two siblings. She attained an honours degree in pharmacy in 1995 and practiced as a senior pharmacist in hospital and retail pharmacy. During her final year, her father died from a heart attack. She was studying towards her masters in pharmacy practice researching "The Social and Behavioural Factors Affecting Tuberculosis in South Africa" in 1997, when she became Miss South Africa.

Miss South Africa 1997
Kerishnie Naiker was crowned as Miss South Africa 1997. By entering the election, she intended to bring public attention to the large population of South Africans of Indian ancestry, who are an important part of  South Africa's history, identity, culture and population, and to raise awareness on tuberculosis. Upon winning the competition, she became the first South African of Indian descent elected Miss South Africa. She became the eventual winner of the title, gaining the right to represent South Africa in Miss Universe 1998, and Miss World 1998.

References

External links
Miss South Africa official website

Living people
Miss South Africa winners
Miss Universe 1998 contestants
Miss World 1998 delegates
People from Durban
South African people of Indian descent
Year of birth missing (living people)
People from eThekwini Metropolitan Municipality
South African pharmacists